The men's doubles competition at the 1992 French Open was held between 25 May and 7 June 1992 on the outdoor clay courts at the Stade Roland Garros in Paris, France. The unseeded team of Jakob Hlasek and Marc Rosset won the title, defeating David Adams and Andrei Olhovskiy in the final.

Seeds

Draw

Finals

Top half

Section 1

Section 2

Bottom half

Section 3

Section 4

External links
 Association of Tennis Professionals (ATP) – main draw
1992 French Open – Men's draws and results at the International Tennis Federation

Men's Doubles
French Open by year – Men's doubles